Mrakovo, Russia may refer to:

Mrakovo, Gafuriysky District, Republic of Bashkortostan, a selo in Gafuriysky District
Mrakovo, Kugarchinsky District, Republic of Bashkortostan, a selo in Kugarchinsky District

See also
 Mrakovo (disambiguation)